Kazanowski (plural: Kazanowscy) was a Polish noble family. Magnates in the 16th and 17th century.
Their origins are traced either to Kazanów in Opoczno County or Kazanów near Lubartów.

Notable members
Dominik Kazanowski (d. 1485) – one of the first notable members of the family in Poland. In 1473 he was granted royal permission to buy Biała.
Zygmunt Kazanowski (1563–1634)
Marcin Kazanowski (1563/66–1636)
Adam Kazanowski (1599–1649)
Dominik Aleksander Kazanowski (1605–1648)   
Marianna Kazanowska (1643–1687)

Palaces

See also

Ciepielów, Masovian Voivodeship
Kazanowski Palace

References

Bibliography
 Polski Słownik Biograficzny, tom XII, Kraków-Wrocław 1966-1967
 Stanisław Szenic, Pitawal warszawski, tom I, Warszawa 1957
 Zygmunt Gloger,  Geografia historyczna ziem dawnej Polski, wyd. 1903 r.
 S. Orgelbranda Encyklopedia Powszechna (1898)
 Seweryn Uruski Herbarz szlachty polskiej
 Kasper Niesiecki Korona polska przy złotey wolności starożytnemi [...] kleynotami [...] ozdobiona [...] podana. T. 2, [D-K]
 Adam Boniecki Herbarz polski T. 13